"Discounts" is a song by American rapper and singer Cupcakke. It was independently released as a single on June 26, 2020. It became her first charting single, debuting at number 10 on the Billboard Digital Songs component chart. The song received critical acclaim from music critics, who praised the production, vocal performance, solo songwriting and maturity.

Background and composition 
"Discounts" and its precursor "Lemon Pepper" were released not long after Cupcakke's hiatus of late 2019. She announced her retirement after being disappointed with "corrupting the youth" with her hypersexualized music. After two months, Cupcakke returned to social media writing "Jesus fasted for 40 days... and so did I."

In the Fantom-produced song, Cupcakke name-drops Azealia Banks and Megan Thee Stallion, and references Cardi B's bruised forehead after attempting to physically attack Nicki Minaj at NYFW 2018.

Reception 
Critics described the song as "fierce"  "fiery", and "bold". Jessica McKinney of Complex highlighted her "witty wordplay and rapid delivery". BrooklynVegan wrote, "CupcakKe remains prolific [...] She goes hard on this one".

Commercial performance 
"Discounts" became CupcakKe's first charting single in her career. It charted on the UK Singles Downloads Chart at number 78 and the Scottish Singles Chart at number 70.

Music video
After announcing it earlier that month, the video titled "Discounts" (The Movie), was officially released on July 28, 2020.

Charts

References 

2020 songs
2020 singles
Cupcakke songs